The Vinnytsia TV Mast is a 354-metre, 1161 ft high guyed steel tube mast, used for FM- and TV-transmission, in Vinnytsia, Ukraine. A special feature of its structure are three crossbars arranged in 120 degree angles in two levels, running from its structure to the guys. It was built in 1961.

Since height reduction of Belmont TV Mast it is the tallest guyed tubular steel mast in the world.

See also
 List of masts

External links
 
 SkyScraperPage.com info page

Radio masts and towers in Europe
Towers in Ukraine
Buildings and structures in Vinnytsia
Towers completed in 1961
1961 establishments in Ukraine
Buildings and structures destroyed during the 2022 Russian invasion of Ukraine